National Iranian Congress (NIC) is a U.S.-based political organization founded in 2013. Led by Amir-Abbas Fakhravar as an offshoot of his Confederation of Iranian Students (CIS), it is a proponent of regime change in Iran and has drafted a constitution for the future regime. It is cofounded by Arzhang Davoodi.

Amir-Abbas Fakhravar visited Knesset of Israel in 2012.

References

Politics of Iran